Shahdara Metrobus Terminal Station is a Lahore Metrobus station in Shahdara Bagh, Punjab, Pakistan, located on the north bank of the Ravi River at Old Ravi Bridge Road. The station is located just south of the junction between N-5 National Highway and N-60 National Highway and serves as the northern terminus of the Lahore Metrobus. The terminal consists of a series of covered platforms and a fenced off busway.

North Platform: Passenger unloading/layover for northbound buses
South Platform: Passenger loading for southbound buses

See also
 Gajjumata Metrobus Terminal Station
 Lahore Metrobus

References

Bus stations in Lahore
Transport in Lahore
Lahore Metro stations